Provincial Trunk Highway 32 (PTH 32) is a provincial primary highway located in the Canadian province of Manitoba. It runs from PTH 14 at Winkler to the U.S. border, where it becomes North Dakota State Highway 32.

The speed limit is 100 km/h from Winkler to just north of the US border, and 50 km/h inside the city of Winkler and in the border/customs area.

Provincial Trunk Highway 32 was ranked the 3rd worst road in all of Manitoba in 2013.

Major intersections

References

External links 
Official Name and Location - Declaration of Provincial Trunk Highways Regulation - The Highways and Transportation Act - Provincial Government of Manitoba
Official Highway Map - Published and maintained by the Department of Infrastructure - Provincial Government of Manitoba (see Legend and Map#2)
Google Maps Search - Provincial Trunk Highway 32

032